John Ferguson (1891 – 23 October 1916) was a Scottish professional footballer who played as a right half in the Scottish League for Third Lanark and St Bernard's.

Personal life 
Ferguson was born in Glasgow and brought up by an aunt in Aberfoyle. He attended Callander High School and the University of Edinburgh. Ferguson served as a second lieutenant in the Cameronians (Scottish Rifles) during the First World War and was mentioned in despatches. He was killed by a grenade near Flers during the Battle of Le Transloy on 23 October 1916, in an action his Captain believed was worthy of a posthumous Victoria Cross. Ferguson is commemorated on the Thiepval Memorial.

References 

Scottish footballers
1916 deaths
British Army personnel of World War I
1891 births
Cameronians officers
Scottish Football League players
St Bernard's F.C. players
Third Lanark A.C. players
Alumni of the University of Edinburgh
Footballers from Glasgow
British military personnel killed in the Battle of the Somme
Association football wing halves
Association football inside forwards
Deaths by hand grenade
Military personnel from Glasgow